Rheinheimera baltica is a bacterium from the genus of Rheinheimera which has been isolated from water from the Baltic Sea.

References 

Chromatiales
Bacteria described in 2002